The New Caledonia national rugby sevens team finished in sixth place at the 2011 Pacific Games.

Squad
Squad to 2015 Pacific Games:
Vaitanaki, Jofrey
Talau Baptiste
Vaisioa Ervin
Palasio Bell
Abry, Arnaud
Jean Jacques Taputai
Emmanuel Roche
Gabriel Keletaona
Alexandre Keletaona
Petelo Falevalu
Jacques Dihace
Nisie Huyard

Previous Squads

2011 Pacific Games

Pool stages
Group C
 17 - 12 
 7 - 36 
41 – 0

Finals
Quarterfinals
 0 - 52 

5–8th Semifinals
 19 - 12 

5th place game
 17 – 19

2011 Oceania Sevens Championship
 7 - 38 
 5 - 45 
 0 - 47 
 7 - 45 
 17 - 12

References

National rugby sevens teams
Rugby union in New Caledonia
R